The Trappists, officially known as the Order of Cistercians of the Strict Observance (abbreviated as OCSO) and originally named the Order of Reformed Cistercians of Our Lady of La Trappe, are a Catholic religious order of cloistered monastics that branched off from the Cistercians. They follow the Rule of Saint Benedict and have communities of both monks and nuns that are known as Trappists and Trappistines, respectively. They are named after La Trappe Abbey, the monastery from which the movement and religious order originated. The movement first began with the reforms that Abbot Armand Jean le Bouthillier de Rancé introduced in 1664, later leading to the creation of Trappist congregations, and eventually the formal constitution as a separate religious order in 1892.

History 
The order takes its name from La Trappe Abbey or La Grande Trappe, located in the French province of Normandy, where the reform movement began. Armand Jean le Bouthillier de Rancé, originally the commendatory abbot of La Trappe, led the reform. As commendatory abbot, de Rancé was a secular individual who obtained income from the monastery but was not a professed monk and otherwise had no monastic obligations. The second son of Denis Bouthillier, a Councillor of State, he possessed considerable wealth and was earmarked for an ecclesiastical career as coadjutor bishop to the Archbishop of Tours. However, after undergoing a conversion of life between 1660 and 1662, de Rancé renounced his possessions, formally joined the abbey, and became its regular abbot in 1663.In 1664, in reaction to the relaxation of practices in many Cistercian monasteries, de Rancé introduced an austere reform. De Rancé's reform was first and foremost centered on penitence; it prescribed hard manual labour, silence, a meagre diet, isolation from the world, and renunciation of most studies. The hard labour was in part a penitential exercise, in part a way of keeping the monastery self-supportive so that communication with the world might be kept at a minimum. This movement spread to many other Cistercian monasteries, which took up de Rancé's reforms. In time, these monasteries also spread and created new foundations of their own. These monasteries called themselves "Trappist" in reference to La Trappe, the source and origin of their reforms.

In 1792, during the French Revolution, La Trappe Abbey, like all other monasteries at the time, was confiscated by the French government and the Trappists expelled. Augustin de Lestrange, a monk of La Trappe at that time, led a number of monks to establish a new monastery in the ruined and unroofed former Carthusian charterhouse of Val-Sainte in the Canton of Fribourg, Switzerland, where the monks subsequently carried out an even more austere reform practising the ancient observances of Benedict of Nursia and the first usages of Cîteaux. In 1794, Pope Pius VI raised Val-Sainte to the status of an abbey and motherhouse of the Trappists, and Dom Augustin was elected the first abbot of the abbey and the leader of the Trappist congregation. However, in 1798, when the French invaded Switzerland, the monks were again exiled and had to roam different countries seeking to establish a new home, until Dom Augustin and his monks of Val-Sainte were finally able to re-establish a community in La Trappe.

In 1834, the Holy See formed all French monasteries into the Congregation of the Cistercian Monks of Notre-Dame de la Trappe, with the abbot of La Trappe being the vicar general of the congregation. However, there were differences in observances between the dependencies of Val-Sainte and those of Notre-Dame de l'Eternité, an abbey itself founded by Val-Sainte in 1795. This led to two different Trappist congregations being formed by decree of the Holy See in 1847. These were named the 'Ancient Reform of Our Lady of La Trappe' and the 'New Reform of Our Lady of La Trappe', the former following the Constitutions of de Rancé, with the latter following the Rule of Saint Benedict combined with the ancient constitution of Cîteaux, except in a few areas prescribed by the Holy See in the same decree.

In 1892, seeking unity amongst the different Trappist observances, the Trappist congregations left the Cistercian Order entirely and merged to form a new order with the approval of Pope Leo XIII named the 'Order of Reformed Cistercians of Our Lady of La Trappe', formalising their identity and spirituality as a separate monastic community.

In 1909, the Trappists of Mariannhill were separated from the rest of the Trappist Order by decree of the Holy See to form the Congregation of Mariannhill Missionaries.

One of the most notable Trappist theologians was Thomas Merton, a prominent author in the mystic tradition and a noted poet and social and literary critic. He entered the Abbey of Gethsemani in 1941 where his writings and letters to world leaders became some of the most widely read spiritual and social works of the 20th century. Merton's widely read works include his autobiography, The Seven Storey Mountain, as well as New Seeds of Contemplation and No Man is an Island.

The first Trappist saint was Rafael Arnáiz Barón, who was a conventual oblate of the Abbey of San Isidro de Dueñas in Dueñas, Palencia. His defining characteristic was his intense devotion to a religious life and personal piety despite the setbacks of his affliction with diabetes mellitus. He died in 1938 aged 27 from complications of diabetes, and was beatified in 1992 by Pope John Paul II and canonised in 2009 by Pope Benedict XVI.

Monastic life 

Trappists, like the Benedictines and Cistercians from whom they originate, follow the Rule of Saint Benedict. "Strict Observance" refers to the Trappists' goal of following the Rule closely. They take the three vows described in the Rule (c. 58): stability, fidelity to monastic life, and obedience.

Benedict's precept to minimize conversation means that Trappists generally speak only when necessary; thus idle talk is strongly discouraged. However, contrary to popular belief, they do not take a vow of silence. According to Benedict, speech disturbs a disciple's quietude and receptivity, and may tempt one to exercise one's own will instead of the will of God. Speech that leads to unkind amusement or laughter is considered evil and is forbidden. A Trappist sign language, one of several monastic sign languages, was developed to render speaking unnecessary. Meals are usually taken in contemplative silence as Trappists listen to a reading.

Unlike the Benedictines and Cistercians, Trappists fully abstain from "flesh meats" (pig, cattle, sheep, venison, etc), described by Saint Benedict as "four-footed animals". However, they generally do not live as strict vegetarians, as they consume poultry, fish and seafood, though their diet mostly consists of vegetables, beans, and grain products. Some monasteries also raise broiler chickens.

Daily Life 

The Liturgy of the Hours is the foundation of every Trappist's life. However, the details of daily life can vary from community to community and based on the liturgical calendar. The following schedule is a representative summary of a Trappist's daily life.

3:30 AM | Rise

4:00 AM | Vigils followed by Meditation, Lectio Divina or private prayer

5:30 AM | Breakfast available

6:30 AM | Lauds

7:30 AM | Eucharist (Mass) (10:00 AM on Sundays)

8:00 AM | Great Silence Ends

8:30 AM | Terce

9:00 AM | Morning work period begins

12:00 PM | Sext

12:15 PM | Dinner

12:45 PM | Rest

1:30 PM | None

1:45 PM | Afternoon work period begins

5:00 PM | Supper

6:00 PM | Vespers

7:30 PM | Compline

8:00 PM | Grand Silence Begins & Retire

Becoming a Trappist 
Though each monastery is autonomous and may have different rules, generally the stages to enter the Trappist life can be described as follows:
 Candidate/observership: candidates or observers visit a monastery and consult the vocation director and/or the superior to help them discern their vocation. Usually they will be asked to live in the monastery for a short period of time, at least one month.
 Postulancy: candidates live as a member of the monastery as a postulant for some months, they are guided by the novice director.
 Novitiate: postulants will be clothed with the monastic habit and are formally received as a member of this order. Novices are still guided by the novice director, and they undergo this stage for two years.
 After novitiate, novices may take temporary vows. They will live this stage for three to nine years to deepen study, practicing the Gospel in the monastic way and integration within the society.
 After finishing the previous stage, the professed members may take final vows for their entire life.

Manual Labor 
The 48th chapter of the Rule of St. Benedict states "for then are they monks in truth, if they live by the work of their hands". Thus, the life of a Trappist monk is centered on manual labor in addition to their spiritual activities. In addition to the tangible results of manual labor, which goes to support the economy of the community and the poor, the monk's work also contributes and reinforces the monk's and community's spiritual growth.

The goods produced range from cheeses, bread and other foodstuffs to clothing and coffins. Their most famous products are Trappist beers. These are a unique category within the beer world, and are lauded for their high quality and flavour. These monasteries brew beer both for the monks themselves and for sale to the general public. Trappist beers contain residual sugars and living yeast, and, unlike conventional beers, will improve with age.

The Trappist monks of the Tre Fontane Abbey raise the lambs whose wool is used to make the pallia of new metropolitan archbishops. The pope blesses the pallia on the Feast of Saints Peter and Paul; the metropolitan archbishops receive those pallia in a separate ceremony within their home dioceses from the hands of the Apostolic Nuncio, who personally represents the pope in their respective countries.

The monks of New Melleray Abbey in rural Peosta, Iowa produce caskets for both themselves and sale to the public.

Cistercian College, Roscrea, a boys' boarding secondary/high school in Ireland, is the only Trappist school left in the world, and one of only two remaining monastic secondary schools in Ireland.

Organization 

Cistercian monasteries have continued to spread, with many founded outside Europe in the 20th century. In particular, the number of Trappist monasteries throughout the world has more than doubled over the past 60 years: from 82 in 1940 to 127 in 1970, and 169 at the beginning of the 21st century. In 1940, there were six Trappist monasteries in Asia and the Pacific, only one Trappist monastery in Africa, and none in Latin America. Now there are 13 in Central and South America, 17 in Africa, and 23 in Asia and the Pacific. In general, these communities are growing faster than those in other parts of the world.

Over the same period, the total number of monks and nuns in the Order decreased by about 15%. There are on average 25 members per community – less than half those in former times. , there were 1,796 Trappist monks and 1,592 Trappistine nuns across the world.

Institutional Structure 
Cistercian communities are autonomous but united in a communion implemented by key institutions:

 Regular Visitation: An independent "Father Immediate" is appointed to help and support the abbot in the exercise of his pastoral charge and to foster concord in the community. The Father Immediate or other representative visits the monastery approximately every two years. The purpose of this “Regular Visitation” is to strengthen and supplement the pastoral action of the local superior, to correct violations where necessary, and to renew the nuns’ or monks’ spiritual fervor.
 General Chapter: The General Chapter is the supreme authority of the order. Since 2011, Abbots and Abbesses form a single General Chapter. They meet every 3 years for three weeks to strengthen the bonds of the order and to make key decisions, including the election of the Abbot General when necessary. The Abbot General chairs the General Chapter.

Abbots General 

The Abbot General is elected for an unrestricted amount of time by the General Chapter. He is assisted by a Council that is composed of five members, four of them are elected by the General Chapter and the fifth is chosen by the elected Council members. The Abbot General and his Council reside in Rome and are generally in charge of the order's affairs. The present Abbot General is Dom Bernardus Peeters of Koningshoeven Abbey in the Netherlands. 

 1892–1904: Sébastien Wyart
 1904–1922: Augustin Marre
 1922–1929: Jean-Baptiste Ollitraut de Keryvallan
 1929–1943: Herman-Joseph Smets
 1943–1951: Dominique Nogues
 1951–1963: Gabriel Sortais
 1964–1974: Ignace Gillet
 1974–1990: Ambroise Southey
 1990–2008: Bernardo-Luis-José Oliveira
 2008–2022: Eamon Fitzgerald
 2022–present: Bernardus Peeters

List of Trappist monasteries and convents 
, there were 168 Trappist monasteries and convents.

See also 
 Cistercian Martyrs of Atlas
 Enclosed religious orders
Missionary Order of Mariannhill

References

External links 

 
 Trappists in the United States

 

1664 establishments in France
Religious organizations established in the 1660s
Christian religious orders established in the 17th century
Catholic monastic orders